Not So Tough Now is the second studio album released in July 1996 by Australian punk rock band Frenzal Rhomb, the follow-up to their first album Coughing Up a Storm. This was the last album with Ben Costello on guitar, who was replaced by Lindsay McDougall not long after its release. The secret track at the end of the album is said to be a song about his departure.

Reviewed in Juice at the time of release, the contrast of "the ocker inflections, beery aggro and dumb-fun pretences" and Jay Whalley's "philosophy student upbringing" were noted. The supporting music was said to be more intense and dense than their previous effort, and sounding similar to NOFX.

The album originally peaked at 58 on the ARIA Charts upon release in 1996, but peaked at 34 in 2021 when the album was reissued on vinyl LP for the first time.

Track listing

Charts

Certifications

References 

1996 albums
Frenzal Rhomb albums
Albums produced by Tony Cohen